Alexandra London (born 29 April 1973 in Paris) is a French actress. She has appeared in more than 25 films since 1989.

Selected filmography

External links 
 

1973 births
Living people
Actresses from Paris